Les aventures des Pieds-Nickelés is a 1948 French film directed by Marcel Aboulker.

Synopsis 
Sherlock Coco, famous detective, tries to thwart the machiavellian plans of the trio of shock. Croquignol, Ribouldingue and Filochard must be extra vigilant, but the profit motive is too strong. As a corollary, the famous pink diamond is also of interest to their legendary enemy, Jo Papillon. But always inventive, they will work out multiple scams and tricks to reach their goals.

Cast 
 Rellys: Croquignol
 Robert Dhéry: Filochard
 Maurice Baquet: Ribouldingue
 Fred Pasquali: Sherlock Coco
 Luc Andrieux: Hector
 Colette Brosset: Irène
 Claire Gérard: the princess
 Fernand Gilbert: Bébert
 Lucien Hector: the brigadier
 André Numès Fils: a guard
 Christian Duvaleix: a gangster
 Roger Saget: a gangster
 Gérard Séty
 Jean Le Poulain

Reception 
The film was popular at the French box office.

References

External links 

1948 films
Films based on French comics
Live-action films based on comics
French comedy films
1948 comedy films
French black-and-white films
1940s French films
1940s French-language films

fr:Les Aventures des Pieds-Nickelés